Babayevo is a rural locality (a selo) in Vorshinskoye Rural Settlement, Sobinsky District, Vladimir Oblast, Russia. The population was 604 as of 2010. There are 23 streets.

Geography 
Babayevo is located 25 km northeast of Sobinka (the district's administrative centre) by road. Yerosovo is the nearest rural locality.

References 

Rural localities in Sobinsky District
Vladimirsky Uyezd